Zell is a municipality in the district of Klagenfurt-Land in the Austrian state of Carinthia.

Geography
Zell lies in a side valley on the north of the Karawank on the Slovenian border about 20 km south of Klagenfurt and 6 km south of Ferlach.

Population
According to the 2001 census, 89.1% of the inhabitants are of Carinthian Slovenian descent, which is the highest percentage of all municipalities in the state of Carinthia.

The commune is situated southwest of the town of Ferlach, on the northern slope of the Koschuta Massif within the Karawanks mountain range. The place was first mentioned as Cel in a 1280 deed. It consists of six villages:

Politics
Seats in the municipal council (2003 elections):
SPÖ: 6
Enotna lista: 4
ÖVP: 1

References

Cities and towns in Klagenfurt-Land District